Kimmen Sjölander (née Warnow) is professor emerita  at the University of California, Berkeley in the Department of Bioengineering. She is well known for her work on protein sequence analysis.

Biography
Sjölander did both her undergraduate and graduate work at the University of California, Santa Cruz in the Department of Computer Science, earning a bachelor's degree in 1993 and a PhD in 1997 under the supervision of David Haussler. She was the chief scientist in the Molecular Applications Group from 1997-1999 (company co-founded by Michael Levitt) and then principal scientist in Protein Informatics at Celera Genomics from 1999-2001, where she was a member of the team (along with J. Craig Venter and Gene Myers) who assembled and annotated the Human Genome.  She joined the faculty at the University of California, Berkeley in the Department of Bioengineering in 2001 as an assistant professor. She was tenured in 2006, and promoted to full professor in 2012.

Awards
Sjölander received the NSF CAREER Award and the Presidential Early Career Award for Scientists and Engineers in 2003.

Research
Sjölander is most well known for her work in phylogenomic methods for protein sequence analysis, including machine learning methods for functional site prediction and ortholog identification, and hidden Markov model (HMM) methods for protein structure prediction, functional subfamily and ortholog classification, remote homology detection, multiple sequence alignment, and phylogenetic tree estimation. Her algorithms were used in the functional annotation of the human genome at Celera Genomics, in the PhyloFacts bioinformatics databases and portals, and contributed to the ModBase database.

Personal
Sjölander's twin sister Tandy Warnow is a professor of computer science at the University of Illinois Urbana–Champaign.

Selected publications

.

.

.

References

Year of birth missing (living people)
Living people
Evolutionary biologists
American women computer scientists
American bioinformaticians
University of California, Santa Cruz alumni
UC Berkeley College of Engineering faculty
21st-century American women